Leinthall Earls or Leinthall Earles is a village in Aymestrey civil parish, Herefordshire, England.

Parish church
The earliest parts of the Church of England parish church or St Andrew are 12th-century Norman. It is part of a single benefice with the parishes of Aymestrey and Kingsland.

Quarry
Leinthall Earls Quarry is north of the village. Up to 2,000 tonnes of aggregate are quarried there daily. A geological fault runs roughly southwest – northeast just south of the quarry, and is downthrown to the south.

References

Villages in Herefordshire